Dolichoderus tricolor is a species of ant in the genus Dolichoderus. Described by Emery in 1914, the species is endemic to New Caledonia.

References

Dolichoderus
Insects of New Caledonia
Insects described in 1914